The Stuttgarter Hymnus-Chorknaben (Stuttgart hymn choir boys) is a German boys' choir founded in Stuttgart in 1900 by the Swabian entrepreneur  in 1900.

History 
Lechler's models were the Thomanerchor and the Dresdner Kreuzchor. The boys soon reached a high artistic level, which was also recognised abroad. Eckhard Weyand succeeded Wilhelm, leading the choir until 1992.

From 1992 until 2010 the choir was directed by Kirchenmusikdirektor Hanns-Friedrich Kunz, who retired in March 2010. The choir has been led by  since. Even though churches and concert halls in Baden-Württemberg are the centre of their public appearances, the choir was on successful concert tours through Germany and Europe.

The choir has a broad repertoire of sacred vocal music, especially music by Johann Sebastian Bach and other Baroque composers. The choir performs in church services.

About 170 boys and 30 young men come together to rehearse in Stuttgart once week, because the choir has no boarding school. The boys start to learn reading easy music and dealing with musical basics at an age of seven or eight years. Later, usually after three years, the boys are introduced to the literature of the concert choir and start to fully participate in concerts. After the voice has changed, the boys can sing as tenors or basses. Skilled voice teachers support the singers in individual voice lessons.

External links
 
 Official website, full German version
 fan site (German and English)

German choirs
Choirs of children
Boys' and men's choirs
Musical groups established in 1900
Musical groups established in 1946
1900 establishments in Germany
Musical groups from Stuttgart